Gloria Warren ( Weiman; April 7, 1926 – September 11, 2021) was an American actress, soprano singer, and philanthropist.

Early years 
Warren was born Gloria Weiman on April 7, 1926, in Wilmington, Delaware. Her parents, Mr. and Mrs. Herman Weiman, were from Eastern Europe (her mother was from Budapest, Hungary). Her father was a jeweler. When she changed her last name to Warren, the rest of her family had their last names changed to Warren, too. She started playing the piano at age eight, and was considered a prodigy by the time she was nine years old. She attended Warner Junior High School.

Career 
Warren was discovered around 1940, when a radio producer saw her showcase her musical talent, including singing and dancing. In 1942, she signed a seven-year contract with the film studio Warner Bros. That same year, she appeared in her first motion picture, Always in My Heart, alongside Kay Francis and Walter Huston. The film was written specifically with her in mind and she received praise for her debut.

In 1943, Warren starred in Cinderella Swings It opposite Guy Kibbee. She was cast in a smaller role in the 1946 Charlie Chan film Dangerous Money. Her last film was Bells of San Fernando (1947), in which she was top-billed along with Donald Woods. She retired from film acting afterwards. Her singing voice was often compared to that of Deanna Durbin.

Personal life 
She married businessman Peter Gold in 1946. They had two children together, Melinda Wiltsie and Daniel Gold. They regularly donated to Pitzer College. Peter died on April 17, 2010, at the age of 85.

Warren died in Los Angeles, California, on September 11, 2021, at the age of 95.

Filmography 
 Always in My Heart (1942)
 Cinderella Swings It (1943)
 Dangerous Money (1946)
 Don't Gamble with Strangers (1946)
 Bells of San Fernando (1947)

References

External links 

 
 
 Gloria Warren at the American Film Institute

1926 births
2021 deaths
20th-century American actresses
20th-century American singers
20th-century American women singers
Actresses from Wilmington, Delaware
American film actresses
American people of Hungarian descent
Musicians from Wilmington, Delaware
Singers from Delaware
21st-century American women